Sister Callista Roy, CSJ (born October 14, 1939) is an American nun, nursing theorist, professor and author. She is known for creating the adaptation model of nursing. She was a nursing professor at Boston College before retiring in 2017. Roy was designated as a 2007 Living Legend by the American Academy of Nursing.

Education 
Roy earned an undergraduate degree in nursing from Mount St. Mary's College in 1963, followed by a master's degree in nursing from University of California, Los Angeles (UCLA) in 1966. She then earned master's and doctoral degrees in sociology from UCLA. She served as a postdoctoral fellow in neuroscience nursing at the University of California, San Francisco. She has been awarded four honorary doctorates.

Career 
Roy was Professor and Nursing Theorist at Boston College's Connell School of Nursing. In 1991, she founded the Boston Based Adaptation Research in Nursing Society (BBARNS), which would later be renamed the Roy Adaptation Association. She has lectured across the United States and in more than thirty other countries. Late in her career, she studied the role of lay study partners in recovery from mild head injury. She retired from Boston College in 2017 and moved back to California.

She belonged to the Sisters of St. Joseph of Carondelet.

Roy Adaptation Model 

During her graduate studies, Roy was compelled by instructor Dorothy E. Johnson to write a conceptual model of nursing. The Roy Adaptation Model was first published in Nursing Outlook in 1970. In this model, humans (as individuals or in groups) are holistic, adaptive systems. The environment consists of internal and external stimuli that surround an individual or group. Health is seen as a sound, unimpaired condition leading to wholeness. Nursing's goal is to promote modes of adaptation that support overall health.

Four modes of adaptation support integrity: physiologic-physical, self-concept group identity, role function and interdependence. In applying Roy's model, the following steps may help to integrate it with the traditional nursing process: assessment of client behavior; assessment of stimuli; nursing diagnosis; goal setting; interventions; and evaluation.

Honors and awards 
 2006: Distinguished Teaching Award, Boston College
 2007: Living Legend, American Academy of Nursing
 2010: Inductee, Sigma Theta Tau's Nurse Researcher Hall of Fame
 2011: Mentor Award, Sigma Theta Tau Society

Published works 
 Proposed: Nursing is a theoretical body of knowledge that prescribes analysis and action to care for an ill person.

 Roy, C. (2009). "Assessment and the Roy Adaptation Model", The Japanese Nursing Journal, 29(11), 5-7.
 Roy, C. (2008). "Adversity and theory: The broad picture", Nursing Science Quarterly, 21(2), 138-139.
 Whittemore, R. & Roy, C. (2002). "Adapting to Diabetes Mellitus: A Theory Synthesis", Nursing Science Quarterly, 15(4), 311-317.

See also
List of Living Legends of the American Academy of Nursing

References 

American nurses
American women nurses
1939 births
Nursing theorists
Living people
Nursing researchers
UCLA School of Nursing alumni
Boston College faculty
Sisters of Saint Joseph
20th-century American Roman Catholic nuns
American women academics
21st-century American Roman Catholic nuns